Louis-Philippe "L. P." Dumoulin (born February 21, 1979) is a Canadian stock car racing driver. He currently races in the NASCAR Pinty's Series, driving the No. 47 Dodge owned by Marc-André Bergeron. He won the series championship in 2014, 2018 and 2021 NASCAR Pinty's Series.

Racing career

NASCAR Xfinity Series
Dumoulin ran the Montreal race each in 2011 and 2012. He drove the No. 52 Chevrolet for Means Motorsports in 2011 and the No. 08 Ford for Randy Hill Racing in 2012. He also attempted Watkins Glen with Randy Hill, but did not qualify.

NASCAR Pinty's Series
Dumoulin has been competing in the Pinty's Series since 2009. He won the championship in 2014, 2018 and 2021. Dumoulin is partnered with WeatherTech Canada and Groupe Bellemare. He has renewed his sponsorship up until the 2021 season.

Rolex Grand-Am Sports Car Series
Dumoulin has participated in 5 races over 4 years in the Rolex Grand-Am Sports Car Series.

Personal life
He is the younger brother of the other racing driver: Jean-François Dumoulin. They are both sons of the other competitor: Richard Dumoulin.

Motorsports career results

NASCAR
(key) (Bold – Pole position awarded by qualifying time. Italics – Pole position earned by points standings or practice time. * – Most laps led.)

Nationwide Series

Pinty's Series

 Season still in progress
 Ineligible for series points

References

External links
 

Living people
1979 births
NASCAR drivers
Racing drivers from Quebec
Sportspeople from Trois-Rivières